Jeju National University Law School is one of the professional graduate schools of Jeju National University, located in Jeju Island, South Korea. Founded in 2009, it is one of the founding law schools in South Korea and is one of the smaller schools with each class in the three-year J.D. program having approximately 40 students.

Controversies
In 2014, the law school allowed a few students to graduate and thereby sit for the bar exam even though they were absent for the entire semester failing to meet the mandatory attendance requirements. The Ministry of Education discovered the irregularities and censured the school and professors who committed the violations of the curricula rules.

References

External links 
 

Law schools in South Korea
Educational institutions established in 2009
2009 establishments in South Korea
ko:제주대학교 법학전문대학원